Founder Technology Group Corporation, a subsidiary of Founder Group from Peking University, is an information technology state-owned enterprise in Shanghai, China. It is engaged in the development of personal computers and computer peripherals, under the brand of "Fang Zheng" (方正), and printed circuit boards.

History
Founder Technology was established in 1986 and listed on the Shanghai Stock Exchange in 1990.

References

External links 
  
  

Companies based in Shanghai
Computer companies established in 1986
Chinese companies established in 1986
Computer companies of China
Peking University
Government-owned companies of China
Chinese brands